Selskabet for de norske Fiskeriers Fremme ("Society for the Promotion of Norwegian Fisheries") is an organization located in Bergen, Norway.

The organization was established on April 26, 1879 in Bergen. In 1882, the company founded the Norges Fiskerimuseum. Exhibitions show the growth of the Norwegian fishing industry from the time of the modernization process during the 1800s. The museum also addresses the current fishing and aquaculture industry with focus  on resource management.

References

External links
Norges Fiskerimuseum website
Fishing in Norway
Organizations established in 1879
Organisations based in Bergen
1879 establishments in Norway
 Museums in Bergen
Local museums in Norway